Privateers and Gentlemen is a role-playing game by author Walter Jon Williams, published by Fantasy Games Unlimited in 1983. Williams based this game on his own historical nautical adventure novels set in the late 18th century "Age of Fighting Sail", and he also incorporated his previously published miniatures game Heart of Oak with a new role-playing system where the player characters are naval officers. The game received positive reviews in game periodicals including Dragon, White Dwarf, and Different Worlds.

Description
Privateers and Gentlemen is a historical naval game system set in the late 18th century during the days of Admiral Horatio Nelson and C.S. Forrester's fictional Captain Horatio Hornblower, sometimes called the "Age of Fighting Sail". The system describes both a role-playing system where players take the roles of naval officers, and a naval miniatures combat system.

The game components are:
Heart of Oak, a 48-page booklet containing 40 pages of rules for miniatures combat and 8 pages of tables and ship cut-outs (also published as a separate role-playing game by Fantasy Games Unlimited)
Promotions and Prizes, a 32-page booklet about the roleplaying system rules
Tradition of Victory, a 32-page booklet containing historical background for the period
A 6-page cardstock referee screen with reference charts
A blank character sheet that could be photocopied
A box

Publication history

In 1981, noted science fiction/cyberpunk author Walter Jon Williams, under the name "Jon Williams", had published a series of nautical adventure novels known as the "Privateers and Gentlemen" series, and the following year had created Heart of Oak, a game of naval miniatures combat, for Fantasy Games Unlimited. 

In 1983, FGU published Privateers and Gentlemen, also designed by Williams, which incorporated both the previously published miniatures game Heart of Oak, and a new roleplaying system. 

In 1986, RAFM produced a miniature specifically for Privateers & Gentlemen called Jack Tar (JT01-JT014).

Reception
In the December 1983 edition of Dragon (Issue #80), Ken Rolston found the inclusion of both a miniatures combat system and a roleplaying system resulted in a game that lacked focus. Rolston also found the rules "not particularly well-presented or well-organized. Reading them and playing them in the playtest of the miniatures rules was frustrating at times... [due to] ambiguities, difficulty of reference and disorganized presentation of procedures." Rolston was also disturbed by the lack of scenarios for either the miniatures game or the roleplaying system, which would force new gamemasters to make up scenarios and adventures themselves. He did believe that "Fans of sailing-ship fiction and those interested in historical role-playing games will be very happy with this game. It sacrifices detail of simulation for action and drama, but the tradeoff still retains a strong atmosphere with an effective mixture of heroic romanticism and grim realism... Since the atmosphere of Privateers and Gentlemen is a prime virtue, historical gamers will probably overlook the less-than-perfect rules presentation." 

In the November 1983 edition of White Dwarf, Ian Waddelow found that Walter Jon Williams wrote the rulebooks "with humour and authority. He makes rule reading absorbing and informative." However, Waddelow criticized the game for its lack of dice and scenarios, but gave the game an overall rating of 9, saying, "This game is highly recommended, and can be played as pure wargaming, pure role-playing, or a mixture of the two. P&G is exciting, flexible and full of atmosphere."
 
In his 1991 historic overview of role-playing games, Heroic Worlds: A History and Guide to Role-Playing Games, Lawrence Schick commented, "The game is very strong on historical detail for those sailors who are in the Royal Navy or are English privateers, but weak for other nationalities."

Review
Different Worlds #8 (June/July, 1980)
 Different Worlds #33 (March/April, 1984)

References

Fantasy Games Unlimited games
Historical role-playing games
Historical Swashbuckler role-playing games
Role-playing games introduced in 1983